A women's slalom event was held at the 1952 Winter Olympics in Oslo, Norway as part of the alpine skiing programme.

On 24 January, a decision was taken that Rødkleiva would hold the slalom events, but at that time there was only  of snow at the site and additional work lasting three days had to be done to ensure the hill would be usable for training and the races. However, the athletes had to shift their training to Norefjell by 9 February after more problems with the snow resulted in the hill "[looking] almost like a skating rink" according to the official report.

The event eventually took place as scheduled on 20 February, a day after the men's slalom races. It was the final alpine skiing event of the Games. There were a total of 26 gates on the women's course. A total of 14 National Olympic Committees were represented at the event by 40 skiers.

Andrea Mead Lawrence, representing the United States, and Dagmar Rom, representing Austria, were considered to be the favourites in the event. However, both skiers suffered falls on their first run, with Mead Lawrence placing fourth and Rom finishing last, effectively putting the latter out of contention. Mead Lawrence managed to post the best time of the second runs, enough to win the gold medal. It was her second gold medal in Oslo after her giant slalom victory. By winning the title, she became the first American skier to win two gold medals at the same Olympics. Ossi Reichert, who led the field after the first run, finished two seconds behind Mead Lawrence in the second run and ended up second overall. Reichert's teammate Annemarie Buchner won bronze.

Results
The official results as published by the Organising Committee for the VI Olympic Winter Games were as follows:

References
General

Specific

Women's alpine skiing at the 1952 Winter Olympics
Oly
Alp